1000 Days is the third studio album by American band Wand. It was released on September 25, 2015, by Drag City.

Critical reception
1000 Days was met with generally favorable reviews from critics. At Metacritic, which assigns a weighted average rating out of 100 to reviews from mainstream publications, this release received an average score of 76, based on 100 reviews.

Track listing

References

2015 albums
Drag City (record label) albums
Wand (band) albums